The 2012 Dutch Darts Masters was the fifth of five PDC European Tour events on the 2012 PDC Pro Tour. The tournament took place at the Van Der Valk Hotel in Nuland, Netherlands, from 26–28 October 2012. It featured a field of 64 players and £82,100 in prize money, with £15,000 going to the winner.

Simon Whitlock won his first European Tour title, defeating Paul Nicholson 6–1 in the final.

Prize money

Qualification
The top 32 players from the PDC Order of Merit automatically qualified for the event. The remaining 32 places went to players from three qualifying events - 20 from the UK Qualifier (held in Dublin on 5 October), eight from the European Qualifier and four from the Host Nation Qualifier.

Robert Thornton withdrew the day before the start of the tournament due to ill health.

1–32

UK Qualifier
  Johnny Haines (quarter-finals)
  Steve Hine (first round)
  James Hubbard (second round)
  Peter Hudson (first round)
  Andy Jenkins (third round)
  Mark Jones (second round)
  Arron Monk (quarter-finals)
  Dennis Priestley (first round)
  Scott Rand (second round)
  Dennis Smith (first round)
  Michael Smith (first round)
  Ross Smith (first round)
  Terry Temple (first round)
  Mick Todd (first round)
  Tony West (first round)
  Ian White (third round)
  Dean Winstanley (first round)
  Brian Woods (first round)
  Dave Ladley (first round)
  Jim Walker (first round)

European Qualifier
  Max Hopp (third round)
  Ronny Huybrechts (first round)
  Per Laursen (first round)
  Kevin Münch (first round)
  Bernd Roith (first round)
  Tomas Seyler (first round)
  Davyd Venken (second round)
  Jyhan Artut (first round)

Host Nation Qualifier
  Toon Greebe (first round)
  Roland Scholten (first round)
  Dick van Dijk (first round)
  Gino Vos (second round)

Draw

References

2012 PDC European Tour
2012 in Dutch sport